Ernst Carl Julius Albrecht (29 June 1930 – 13 December 2014) was a German politician of the Christian Democratic Union and a former high-ranking European civil servant. He was one of the first European civil servants appointed in 1958 and served as Director-General of the Directorate-General for Competition from 1967 to 1970. He served as Minister President of the state of Lower Saxony from 1976 to 1990. He was the father of the politician Ursula von der Leyen, the President of the European Commission.

Background
Ernst Albrecht was born in Heidelberg, the son of the psychologist, psychotherapist and medical doctor Carl Albrecht, who was known for developing a new method of meditation; the Albrecht family had been among the hübsche ("genteel") families of the Electorate of Hanover as doctors, jurists and civil servants since the 17th century, but his immediate ancestors had been wealthy cotton merchants in Bremen and members of the city-state's Hanseatic elite in the 19th and 20th centuries. His grandmother Mary Ladson Robertson was an American of prominent planter class origin from Charleston, South Carolina, and a descendant of James H. Ladson and several colonial governors.

European Commission, 1958–1970
Ernst Albrecht studied law and economics. In 1958 he moved to Brussels where he became one of the first European civil servants. He initially served as the Chef de Cabinet to the European Commissioner for Competition Hans von der Groeben in the Hallstein Commission, and in 1967, at the age of 37, he became the Director-General of the Directorate-General for Competition.

Business and political career
Albrecht entered politics in his native Germany when he was elected to the Lower Saxon Landtag (parliament) in 1970, and moved to Hanover with his family the following year. From 1971 to 1976, he was CEO of Bahlsen.

When Alfred Kubel resigned from the office of State Premier in 1976, Albrecht was unexpectedly elected as his successor. Since he received three more votes than his party had representatives in the Legislative Assembly, some members of the governing coalition SPD and FDP must have secretly voted for him. He was re-elected in state parliament elections in 1978, 1982 and 1986.

Albrecht is known for the decision to make the County of Lüchow-Dannenberg the state's "nuclear district"; only a radioactive waste dump at Gorleben was realized, however. During his tenure Albrecht was embroiled in an unusually large number of political scandals; most famously, the Celle Hole. In 1980, Albrecht launched a campaign for election as Chancellor, but he lost out to fellow conservative Franz-Josef Strauß. Albrecht did not contest the 1990 state elections. Instead, then-President of the Bundestag and Göttingen Member of the German Bundestag Rita Süssmuth was lead candidate. They had an agreement whereby, if re-elected, Albrecht would continue as Minister-President until 1992, then Süssmuth would take over. Süssmuth lost the 1990 state elections to Gerhard Schröder, who later became Chancellor.

Personal life

Albrecht married Heidi Adele Stromeyer (1928–2002) in 1953. They had seven children, among them politician Ursula von der Leyen and Hans-Holger Albrecht, President & CEO of the international telecom and media group Deezer. A daughter died at age 11 and one son at age 49 of cancer.

His brother was George Alexander Albrecht, a conductor. Ernst Albrecht had Alzheimer's disease since 2003, which was announced to the public in 2008. He died at the age of 84 in Burgdorf in December 2014.

Ancestry

References

1930 births
2014 deaths
People from Osterholz
People from the Province of Hanover
Presidents of the German Bundesrat
German Lutherans
Christian Democratic Union of Germany politicians
Ministers-President of Lower Saxony
Grand Crosses 1st class of the Order of Merit of the Federal Republic of Germany
Cornell University alumni
German people of American descent
German people of English descent
20th-century Lutherans
Albrecht family